Rémi Desbonnet (born 28 February 1992) is a French handballer for Montpellier Handball and the French national team.

Honours
Coupe de France
Winner: 2013

References

External links

1992 births
Living people
French male handball players
Montpellier Handball players